The National Monuments Foundation is a non-profit organization that builds monuments, including the World Athletes Monument and the Millennium Gate.

History and management
The foundation was conceived in 1999 and established in 2003 to commemorate the turn of the millennium.  The Board of Directors and Senior Management of the National Monuments Foundation includes Rodney Mims Cook, Jr. (president), Cullen Hammond, Rawson Haverty, Jr., Pamela Rollins, Robert Tolleson, Arol Wolford, Sally Singletary, Lou Glenn, Colin Amery, Tommy Bagwell, Richard H. Driehaus, Susan Eisenhower, Tom Glenn, Remar Sutton, Priscilla Roosevelt, Lovette Russell, John Addison, Carolyn Lee Wills, and Tom Wolfe.

Monuments erected
The National Monuments Foundation has erected a number of monuments in the United States.  Among these are the World Athletes Monument (also known as The Prince of Wales Monument), the Millennium Gate, the Peace and Justice Gates, the Buckhead Midtown Gates, the Newington-Cropsey Foundation's Gallery of Art, the Princess Royal Millennium Monument, and the John F. Kennedy, Jr Memorial.

Currently
The National Monuments Foundation is consulting with the Adams Presidential Library and Memorial Foundation for a memorial to commemorate the second and sixth presidents of the United States and their wives, and the National Civic Art Society for a memorial to President Dwight D. Eisenhower, both in Washington, D.C. The National Monuments Foundation is also involved in an effort to re-establish Mims Park, an original Olmsted Brothers designed park in the English Avenue and Vine City neighborhood in downtown Atlanta.

Rodney Mims Cook Jr.

Rodney Mims Cook Jr. is a developer and designer, and founder and president of the foundation.

Early life and education
Cook's father, Rodney Mims Cook Sr., was a member of the Georgia House of Representatives. His mother, Bettijo, moved and then restored the antebellum historic plantation Tullie Smith House to the grounds of the Atlanta History Center. A graduate of The Lovett School, Cook received a BA degree from Washington and Lee University.

Career
In May 2008, Cook opened the Millennium Gate Museum, the largest classical monument erected in the U.S. since the Jefferson Memorial.

Recognition
Cook's organization, the National Monuments Foundation, received the 2006 Palladio Award for best new public space in the United States for the Peace and Justice Gate and Plaza.

References

External links
 National Monuments Foundation Official website
 The Millennium Gate and Museum official website

Monuments and memorials in the United States
Organizations based in Atlanta
New Classical architecture